The Maurice Farman MF.11 Shorthorn is a French aircraft developed before World War I by the Farman Aviation Works.  It was used as a  reconnaissance and light bomber during the early part of World War I, later being relegated to training duties.

The Maurice Farman Shorthorn was the aircraft in which Biggles, Capt W.E. Johns' fictional character, first took to the air in "Biggles Learns To Fly".

Design and development
A pusher configuration unequal-span biplane like the earlier Farman MF.7, the MF.11 differed in lacking the forward-mounted elevator, the replacement of the biplane horizontal tail surfaces with a single surface with a pair of rudders mounted above it, and the mounting of the nacelle containing crew and engine in the gap between the two wings.  The aircraft was also fitted with a machine gun for the observer, whose position was changed from the rear seat to the front in order to give a clear field of fire.

Its nickname in British service was derived from that of the MF.7 Longhorn, as it lacked the characteristic front-mounted elevator and elongated skids of its predecessor.

Operational history

On 6 September 1914 the first air-sea battle took place when a Japanese Farman MF.11 aircraft launched by the seaplane carrier  unsuccessfully attacked SMS Kaiserin Elisabeth with bombs.

The MF.11 served in both the British and French air services on the Western Front in the early stages of the war. It flew the first bombing raid of the war when on 21 December 1914 an MF.11 of the Royal Naval Air Service attacked German artillery positions around Ostend, Belgium.

The MF.11 was withdrawn from front-line service on the Western Front in 1915, but continued to be used by the French in Macedonia and the Middle East, while the British also used it in the Dardanelles, and Africa. The Australian Flying Corps (AFC), provided with the MF.11 by the British Indian Army, operated it during the Mesopotamian campaign of 1915–16.

Italy's Società Italiana Aviazione, a Fiat company, licence-built a number of MF.11s under the designation SIA 5 from early 1915, fitted with a fixed forward machine gun and a 74.5 kW (100 hp) Fiat A.10 engine.

In 1916, the AFC also bought some MF.11s for training purposes.

Operators
 
 Australian Flying Corps
No. 5 (Training) Squadron AFC in United Kingdom
Mesopotamian Half Flight
Central Flying School AFC at Point Cook, Victoria

Belgian Air Force

French Air Force

Corpo Aeronautico Militare

Hellenic Air Force

Hejaz Air Force - Two Farman MF.11s were obtained from Italy in 1921.

Imperial Japanese Army Air Service

Royal Norwegian Air Force

Portuguese Air Force

Romanian Air Corps

Imperial Russian Air Force
 
Royal Saudi Air Force

Serbian Air Force

Spanish Air Force

Swiss Air Force

Ukrainian Air Force - One aircraft only.

Royal Flying Corps
No. 2 Squadron RFC
No. 3 Squadron RFC
No. 4 Squadron RFC
No. 9 Squadron RFC
No. 14 Squadron RFC
No. 16 Squadron RFC
No. 19 Squadron RFC
No. 23 Squadron RFC
No. 24 Squadron RFC
No. 25 Squadron RFC
No. 29 Squadron RFC
No. 30 Squadron RFC
No. 65 Squadron RFC
Royal Naval Air Service

Survivors
 The Canada Aviation Museum has an MF.11 manufactured by Airco for the Royal Flying Corps and sent to Australia in 1916.
 Farman F.11A-2, Royal Army and Military History Museum, Brussels, Belgium.
 Farman MF.11 Shorthorn (#CFS-15), RAAF Museum at Point Cook, Victoria, Australia.

Specifications (Farman MF.11)

See also

References

Bibliography

External links

 Luftfahrtmuseum
 Canadian Aviation Museum

1910s French military reconnaissance aircraft
1910s French bomber aircraft
Single-engined pusher aircraft
Biplanes
MF.11
1910s French military trainer aircraft
Aircraft first flown in 1913